Trisuloides prosericea is a moth of the family Noctuidae. It is found in China (Guangdong).

References

Moths described in 2011
Pantheinae